Croydon railway station is located on the Lilydale line in Victoria, Australia. It serves the eastern Melbourne suburb of Croydon, and it opened on 1 December 1882 as Warrandyte. It was renamed Croydon on 1 August 1884.

History

Croydon station opened on 1 December 1882, when the line from Camberwell was extended to Lilydale. Like the suburb itself, the station was named after Croydon in Surrey, England. The name was suggested by local landowner Gregory Lacey, whose wife was originally from Croydon. The station was built on parts of land owned by Lacey.

In 1957, the line between Croydon and Mooroolbark was duplicated, with a number of sidings provided at the same time. In 1978, the goods yard was closed and, in that same year, a number of sidings were abolished. In 1979, the present Coolstore Road level crossing, located in the Down direction of the station, was provided, replacing a previous level crossing.

On 30 June 1984, the current Platform 1 opened, as part of the duplication of the line between Croydon and Ringwood. The remaining sidings were also abolished during this time. On 31 July 1996, Croydon was upgraded to a Premium Station.

On 29 July 2021, the Level Crossing Removal Project announced that the Coolstore Road level crossing will be grade separated by 2025, with a rail bridge to be built over the road. The level crossing removal will also involve the construction of a new station. On 6 August 2022, early concept designs were released.

Platforms and services

Croydon has two side platforms. It is serviced by Metro Trains' Lilydale line services.

Platform 1:
  all stations and limited express services to Flinders Street; all stations shuttle services to Ringwood

Platform 2:
  all stations services to Lilydale

Transport links

Kinetic Melbourne operates one route via Croydon station, under contract to Public Transport Victoria:
 : to Ringwood station (loop service)

Ventura Bus Lines operates ten routes via Croydon station, under contract to Public Transport Victoria:
 : Chirnside Park Shopping Centre – Westfield Knox
 : Ringwood station – Box Hill Institute Lilydale Lakeside Campus
 : to Chirnside Park Shopping Centre
 : to Chirnside Park Shopping Centre
 : to Upper Ferntree Gully station
 : to Montrose
 : to Boronia station
 : to Monash University Clayton Campus
  : to Glen Waverley station (Saturday and Sunday mornings only)
 

 also operates a service from Croydon station to Melbourne Airport.

References

External links
 
 Melway map at street-directory.com.au

Premium Melbourne railway stations
Railway stations in Melbourne
Railway stations in Australia opened in 1882
Railway stations in the City of Maroondah